Sri Venkitaramanan was the eighteenth Governor of the Reserve Bank of India. He served for a period of 2 years, from 1990 to 1992. Earlier, he served as Finance Secretary in the Ministry of Finance, from 1985 to 1989.

Venkitaramanan is seen by many as a brilliant crisis manager of the balance of payments crisis in India in the late 1980s and early 1990s. His timely and decisive action laid the ground work for India salvaging the crisis, at a time when India's foreign-exchange reserves had almost depleted.

Early life and background
Venkitaramanan was born at the town of Nagercoil in Padmanathapuram division of the princely-state of Travancore, to a Tamil Iyer family.

He completed his master's degree in Physics from University College Thiruvananthapuram, Kerala and also earned a master's degree in Industrial Administration from Carnegie Mellon University, Pittsburgh, USA.

IAS

Venkitaramanan was a member of the Indian Administrative Service. He was posted with the Government of India and with the state of Tamilnadu at various times. He also served the Government of Karnataka as adviser.

Finance Secretary

He served as Finance Secretary in the Ministry of Finance, Government of India for a period of four years from 1985 to 1989.

Governor of Reserve Bank

Venkitaramanan served as Governor of the Reserve Bank of India from  22 December 1990 to 21 December 1992.
At the time of his appointment as RBI Governor, India was in the midst of a balance of payments crisis, with fast-depleting foreign exchange reserves. His decisive actions helped India tide over the crisis. During his tenure as RBI Governor, the infamous Harshad Mehta scam was exposed by Sucheta Dalal.

Later years
After retirement, Venkitaramanan served as the Chairman of Ashok Leyland Investment Services Ltd., New Tirupur Area Development Corporation Ltd. and Ashok Leyland Finance Ltd. He also served in the boards of Reliance Industries Limited, SPIC, Piramal Healthcare Ltd, Tamil Nadu Water Investment Co. Ltd and Housing Development Finance Corp. Ltd.

His daughter Girija Vaidyanathan — a 1981, Tamil Nadu cadre Indian Administrative Service officer — served as the Chief Secretary of Tamil Nadu.

Published books

Venkitaramanan has published three books, Indian Economy: Reviews And Commentaries - Vol I, Indian Economy: Reviews And Commentaries - Vol II, and Indian Economy: Reviews And Commentaries - Vol III.

In popular culture

Actor Anant Mahadevan portrayed Venkitaramanan in Scam 1992, a Sony Liv's original web series based on 1992 Indian stock market scam of Harshad Mehta.

References

People from Kanyakumari district
Living people
Governors of the Reserve Bank of India
Indian bankers
Indian Administrative Service officers
University of Kerala alumni
Tepper School of Business alumni
Businesspeople from Tamil Nadu
1931 births